Der Lottogewinner ("The lottery winner") is a comedy sketch by German humorist Loriot. It was first broadcast in 1976 in the TV show Loriot, starring Heinz Meier and Claus Dieter Clausnitzer.

Plot 
The central character of the sketch is 66 years old retiree Erwin Lindemann (Heinz Meier) who has won 500,000 Deutsche Mark in the lottery. Sitting in a chair in his living room, he is interviewed by a TV team for the evening news. Lindemann, visibly nervous, is only asked to give this short statement:

Because of various technical issues and adjustments made by the increasingly frustrated director, Lindemann is repeatedly interrupted and has to repeat his text several times, which makes him more confused after each shot. Finally, the cinematographer warns that film is running out, and the director is satisfied with Lindemann's last attempt, which is performed reasonably fluently, but has become completely jumbled:

Broadcast and reception 
Der Lottogewinner was the last of 15 sketches in the first episode of the six-part TV series Loriot, first broadcast on 8 March 1976 on ARD. It is considered one of the most famous sketches by Loriot and Heinz Meier's best-known role.

Loriot originally intended the character of Erwin Lindemann to speak with a slight West Low German accent. Meier, who was from near Königsberg and perfectly spoke East Prussian (High Prussian) dialect, convinced Loriot of letting speak Lindemann in a slightly East Prussian idiom.

According to Jörg Thomann in the Frankfurter Allgemeine Zeitung, with the character of the confused Erwin Lindemann, Loriot created "a moving portrayal of the modern individual who is pushed by their fellow human beings (in this case: a director) towards self-denial and, through all their ambitions (such as the gentlemen's boutique in Wuppertal), losing their bearing – until they forget their own name". Loriot, who usually starred himself in his sketches, was referring to the popularity of the character when he said to Heinz Meier: "I have made two big mistakes: I didn't build a basement for my house, and I let you play Lindemann".

Sources 
 Loriot: Gesammelte Prosa. Alle Dramen, Geschichten, Festreden, Liebesbriefe, Kochrezepte, der legendäre Opernführer und etwa zehn Gedichte. Zürich: Diogenes Verlag, 2006. 
 Stefan Lukschy: Der Glückliche schlägt keine Hunde. Ein Loriot-Porträt. Berlin: Aufbau-Verlag, 2015.

References

External links 
 Script of the sketch, Ernst Klett Verlag (PDF, ca. 133 KB)

Comedy sketches
Television in fiction
1976 in German television